Rápulo River also Ráputo River is a river in Beni Department, Bolivia. It is a tributary of the Yacuma River in the Amazon Basin. It joins the Yacuma just below the town of Santa Ana del Yacuma.

References

Rivers of Beni Department